Air Bud is a 1997 sports "comedy" film directed by Charles Martin Smith.  The film was financially successful, grossing $4 million in its opening weekend and totaling $27.8 million in its run against an estimated $3 million budget.

Plot
After the death of his father, Josh Framm, his mother Jackie, and his two-year-old sister Andrea have relocated to Fernfield, Washington. After school, Josh practices basketball by himself in a makeshift court that he sets up behind an abandoned church, where he meets a runaway Golden Retriever that had just escaped from his abusive owner: a rude, grumpy, alcoholic party clown named Norm Snively. Discovering his uncanny ability to play basketball; Josh names him Buddy and takes him home. Jackie agrees to let Buddy stay until Christmas. Once the holidays arrive, Jackie allows Josh to keep Buddy as a Christmas present.

At school, Josh earns the disdain of star basketball player and team bully Larry Willingham but befriends kindhearted maintenance engineer and retired pro player Arthur Chaney. With Chaney's encouragement, Josh earns a place on the school basketball team, the Timberwolves, despite the reservation of their competitive coach, Joe Barker. He befriends teammate Tom Stewart at his first game. Buddy escapes and shows up at school during the game. The audience loves him when he scores a basket.

Barker is fired after being caught emotionally abusing Tom for his poor performance and is replaced by Arthur at Josh's suggestion. Arthur emphasizes the need for players to work as a team instead of focusing on themselves. When Larry is subbed out due to ball-hogging and unsportsmanlike conduct, his father forces him to leave the team and join their rival. Buddy becomes the mascot of the school's basketball team and appears in their halftime shows. The Timberwolves lose one game before qualifying for the State Finals.

Just before the championship game, Snively appears after seeing Buddy on television. Hoping to profit from Buddy's newfound fame, he forces Jackie to hand over Buddy as he has papers proving he is the legal owner. Withdrawn and depressed, Josh sneaks into Snively's backyard and frees Buddy from his chain. Snively pursues them in his dilapidated pickup truck before crashing into a lake. Josh decides to protect Buddy by setting him free in the forest to find a new life.

The Timberwolves struggle at the championship game, and an injury leaves them with four players. Buddy shows up. After it is discovered that there is no rule preventing a dog from playing basketball, he is added to the roster and leads the team to victory.

Despite losing his papers from the car wreck, Snively attempts to sue the Framm family for custody of Buddy, and Chaney suggests that Buddy choose his owner. As a fan of Chaney himself, Judge Cranfield accepts his proposal and moves the court outside to the lawn. Buddy attacks Snively and chooses Josh. Cranfield grants custody to Josh as a ranting Snively is taken away by the police, while Josh and the rest of the citizens rejoice and gather around Buddy to welcome him home.

Cast

Production
The film was produced by the newly formed banner of Keystone Entertainment, Keystone Family, with Miramax/Disney planned the franchise for an estimated $6 million domestic rights to the first film, as well as worldwide rights to sequels.

The film was originally planned to release through Miramax. However, it was instead moved as a Walt Disney Pictures release.

Home media
Air Bud was released to VHS on December 23, 1997, and to DVD on February 3, 1998 (with an open matte aspect ratio). The film was released direct-to-video in October 1999 in the UK by Warner Home Video under the Warner Bros. Family Entertainment label.

The film was released again on March 3, 2009, in a special edition DVD set presenting the film in its original theatrical aspect ratio. In addition, the special edition DVD includes commentary from Buddy and his puppies, as the series had introduced speaking animals by that time.

Mill Creek Entertainment released the movie in a two-disc boxed set also containing the other Air Bud movies owned by Air Bud Entertainment on January 14, 2020.

Reception

Audiences polled by CinemaScore gave the film an average grade of "A" on an A+ to F scale.

Sequels

The film was followed by one theatrical sequel, three direct-to-video sequels and a spin-off film series. In each film, Buddy learns to play a different sport while the spin-offs focus on Buddy's children, the Buddies.

References

External links
 
 
 
 

1997 films
1990s sports films
Films about dogs
American basketball films
American sports comedy films
Films about animals playing sports
Films set in Washington (state)
Films shot in British Columbia
Air Bud (series)
Walt Disney Pictures films
Films directed by Charles Martin Smith
American children's comedy films
Films about animals
1990s sports comedy films
1990s children's films
1997 comedy films
Canadian children's comedy films
Canadian sports comedy films
Canadian basketball films
1990s English-language films
1990s American films
1990s Canadian films